Little Abitibi Provincial Park is a non-operating provincial park  north of Cochrane, Ontario. It holds a network of small lakes which run into the Little Abitibi River. The Little Abitibi River runs about  up into the Abitibi Canyon, where the Ontario Power Generation dams the river at Fraserdale, an abandoned railway town.

It was made famous in "The Blackfly Song" and the animated film adaptation Blackfly, which concerned the construction of a dam on the Little Abitibi River.

References

External links

Provincial parks of Ontario
Protected areas of Cochrane District
Protected areas established in 1985
1985 establishments in Ontario